Burlingtons Bar is under the Town House public house in Lytham St Annes, Lancashire, England.  It is recorded in the National Heritage List for England as a designated Grade II listed building.

The bar is on the Campaign for Real Ale's National Inventory of Historic Pub Interiors. The floor, wall, and bar are all completely tiled.

It was built in 1895 under St Anne's Hotel. The hotel was demolished in 1985, but Burlingtons Bar was retained as the basement for the Crescent Pub, later renamed the Town House.

See also

Listed buildings in Saint Anne's on the Sea

References

National Inventory Pubs
Pubs in Lancashire
Buildings and structures in the Borough of Fylde
Grade II listed buildings in Lancashire